The Brighton and Chichester Railway was an early railway in southern England running between the towns of Shoreham and Chichester in Sussex. It operated between 1845 and 1846.

History

Following the completion of the London and Brighton Railway (LBR) in 1841, with its branch line running to Shoreham, a natural extension appeared to be westwards towards Chichester and ultimately Portsmouth. A new company was therefore created in 1844 to build the first stage of such a line, which would then be operated by the LBR. The new company achieved Parliamentary approval in July of that year construction began.

Construction
The new line involved constructing a viaduct at Shoreham and an opening bridge over the River Arun at Ford, West Sussex. The new line was opened in stages between November 1845 and June 1846.
 Shoreham - Worthing, November 1845
 Worthing - Littlehampton, March 1846
 Littlehampton - Chichester, June 1846.

Extensions
In August 1845 the company received Parliamentary approval to continue their line to towards Havant and Fareham. Shortly afterwards the company was purchased by the LBR, but remained separate.

Formation of LB&SCR
Construction of the extension to Havant was just commencing when the company ceased to exist when it was formally merged with others to form the London, Brighton and South Coast Railway (LB&SCR) by Act on 27 July 1846.

References

Transport in Brighton and Hove
Early British railway companies
Railway companies established in 1844
Railway lines opened in 1846
Railway companies disestablished in 1846
London, Brighton and South Coast Railway
1844 establishments in England
British companies disestablished in 1846
British companies established in 1844